K. S. Sabarinadhan (born 5 September 1983) is an Indian politician who belongs to the Indian National Congress. He represented Aruvikkara constituency in the Kerala Legislative Assembly from 2015 to 2021.

Early life and education
Sabarinadhan was born to former minister and speaker G. Karthikeyan and M. T. Sulekha in Thiruvananthapuram on 5 September 1983.

Sabarinadhan did his schooling at Loyola School, Thiruvananthapuram. He graduated in Electrical Engineering from College of Engineering, Trivandrum in 2005. Thereafter he worked for a brief period in IT sector at Mindtree, Bangalore. He completed his MBA from Management Development Institute, Gurgaon in 2008. After that, he worked with the Tata Group in Mumbai for several years, eventually spending a few years working with the Tata Trusts in the areas of healthcare and nutrition.

Personal life 
 
Sabarinadhan is married to Divya S. Iyer, a civil service officer, thus becoming the first MLA–IAS couple in Kerala. The couple have a son.

Political career
In 2015, Sabarinadhan contested the by-election from Aruvikkara constituency, which was vacated due to the death of his father. He defeated M. Vijayakumar by a margin of 10,128 votes.

In the 2016 Kerala Legislative Assembly election, he was re-elected from Aruvikkara constituency. He defeated A. A. Rasheed of CPI(M) by a margin of 21,314 votes. In 2020, he became the vice president of Kerala Youth Congress.
In the 2021 Kerala Legislative Assembly election, he lost to G. Steephen of the CPI(M) by 5046 votes.

References

Living people
Indian National Congress politicians from Kerala
Kerala MLAs 2011–2016
Kerala MLAs 2016–2021
1983 births